Gorom-Gorom is a department or commune of Oudalan Province in northern Burkina Faso. Its capital is the town of Gorom-Gorom.

Towns and villages

References

Departments of Burkina Faso
Oudalan Province